II is the second studio album from the Finnish group Kingston Wall.

This album was originally released under the band's own record label, Trinity, in February 1993. It was also licensed and released in Japan by Japanese Zero record label. Both of these prints have been sold-out in the 1990s and are considered somewhat collector's items. The Japanese print included English lyrics in the jewel case insert booklet as well as Japanese translations of the lyrics.

In 1998, Finnish record label Zen Garden (later SonyBMG Finland) re-released the whole Kingston Wall discography as remastered versions along with a 2-disc limited print-version of each album which included a Bonus CD featuring rare/unreleased studio and live material. These 2-disc versions have also been sold-out and are considered collectibles. The album is still available as a remastered 1-disc version from Zen Garden (2006).

Track listing
"We Cannot Move"  – 4:39 (Kingston Wall)
"Istwan"  – 4:02 (Kingston Wall)
"Could It Be So?"  – 5:52 (Kingston Wall)
"And It's All Happening"  – 6:07 (Kingston Wall)
"Love Tonight"  – 6:40 (Kingston Wall)
"Two Of a Kind"  – 6:23 (Kingston Wall)
"I Feel Love"  – 6:39 (Giorgio Moroder, Donna Summer)
"Shine On Me"  – 7:05 (Kingston Wall)
"You"  – 10:11 (Kingston Wall)
"Palékastro"  – 4:54 (Kingston Wall)

1998 re-issue limited edition bonus CD
"Between The Trees" – 3:36 (Kingston Wall)
"She's so Fine" – 3:34 (N. Redding)
"Can't Get Thru" (live) – 11:15 (S. Kuoppamäki / P. Walli / Kingston Wall)

Tracks 1 & 2 have been originally released on the "We Cannot Move" single.
Track 3 is a live recording from Henry's Pub on Kuopio on September 30, 1993 by Robert Palomäki.

Personnel
Petri Walli - guitars, vocals, mixing
Jukka Jylli - bass, backing vocals
Sami Kuoppamäki - drums, percussion
Sakari Kukko - saxophone ("Shine On Me")
Ufo Mustonen - violins ("Istwan")
Tom Vuori - mixing
Pauli Saastamoinen, Robert Palomäki - remastering (1998 reissue)
Eppu Walli and Kie Von Hertzen - cover design, illustrations
Petteri Vilkki - technical support, colors
Joni Vihervä - photography

References

1993 albums
Kingston Wall albums